Kay Espenhayn (20 August 1968 - 15 September 2002) was a former German Paralympic swimmer. She was born in a Christian family and was the first German to become a UNICEF ambassador in disabled sports.

Swimming career
Espenhayn studied at the Leipzig Medical School in 1986 to 1989 where she got a job at Diakonissenhaus Leipzig as a medical technical laboratory assistant after graduation. During her studies, she attended a regular swimming group and became a lifeguard at the Kulkwitzer See near her hometown on the border of the Baltic Sea.

In 1989, Espenhayn had a swollen lymph node removed from her neck but the operation went wrong and it inadvertently cut through a nerve which affected her cervical spine, right shoulder joint and right arm which restricted most movement in her right arm. After the operation, she quit her job and focussed on swimming and joined the Leipzig Disabled Sports Club. In 1993, she suffered from spinal disc damage from her nursing job, she had surgery on her spine and six-month hospital stay, she was diagnosed with complete paraplegia from the fifth thoracic vertebrae and spent the rest of her life in a wheelchair.

In 1994, she began competitive swimming at the Saxony Championships in April, the German championships in July of that year. Her first international appearance was at the Dutch championships in 1995 where she swam four world records at the European Championships in Perpignan. Tragedy struck in December 1995 when Espenhayn was involved in a car accident in Kreischa and was then told by doctors that she wouldn't walk again. Once she was discharged from hospital in March 1996, she was able to participate in the German Open championships and qualified for the 1996 Summer Paralympics in Atlanta where she won six medals: three gold, two silver and one bronze and qualified again for the 2000 Summer Paralympics in Sydney where she won five silver medals.

Death
Espenhayn died of complications to lung, kidney and heart disease in a hospital in Leipzig on 15 September 2002.

References

1968 births
2002 deaths
Swimmers from Leipzig
Paralympic swimmers of Germany
Swimmers at the 1996 Summer Paralympics
Swimmers at the 2000 Summer Paralympics
Medalists at the 1996 Summer Paralympics
Medalists at the 2000 Summer Paralympics
Paralympic medalists in swimming
Paralympic gold medalists for Germany
Paralympic silver medalists for Germany
Paralympic bronze medalists for Germany
German female freestyle swimmers
German female medley swimmers
S4-classified Paralympic swimmers
21st-century German women
20th-century German women